693 Zerbinetta is a minor planet orbiting the Sun. It was discovered on 21 September 1909 by August Kopff in Heidelberg. It was named after a character in Richard Strauss' opera Ariadne auf Naxos.

Between 2003 and 2022, 693 Zerbinetta has been observed to occult seventeen stars.

References

Further reading

External links 
 ASTROMETRIC UPDATE: OCCULTATION BY (693) ZERBINETTA - 2014 APR 23
 ASTROMETRIC UPDATE: OCCULTATION BY (693) ZERBINETTA - 2014 Sep 30
 
 

000693
Discoveries by August Kopff
Named minor planets
000693
19090921